The Reichsgau Lower Danube (German: Reichsgau Niederdonau) was an administrative division of Nazi Germany consisting of areas in Lower Austria, Burgenland, southeastern parts of Bohemia, southern parts of Moravia, later expanded with Devín and Petržalka. It existed between 1938 and 1945.

History
The Nazi Gau (plural Gaue) system was originally established in a party conference on 22 May 1926, in order to improve administration of the party structure. From 1933 onwards, after the Nazi seizure of power, the Gaue increasingly replaced the German states as administrative subdivisions in Germany. On 12 March 1938 Nazi Germany annexed Austria and on 24 May the Austrian provinces were reorganized and replaced by seven Nazi party Gaue. Under the Ostmarkgesetz law of 14 April 1939 with effect of 1 May, the Austrian Gaue were raised to the status of Reichsgaue and their Gauleiters were subsequently also named Reichsstatthalters.

At the head of each Gau stood a Gauleiter, a position which became increasingly more powerful, especially after the outbreak of the Second World War. Local Gauleiters were in charge of propaganda and surveillance and, from September 1944 onwards, the Volkssturm and the defence of the Gau.

The position of Gauleiter in Lower Danube was held by Hugo Jury for the duration of the existence of the Gau.

Administrative divisions
The administrative divisions of the Gau:

Urban districts / Stadtkreise 
City of Krems
City of Sankt Pölten
City of Wiener Neustadt

Rural districts / Landkreise 
Landkreis Amstetten
Landkreis Baden
Landkreis Bruck an der Leitha
Landkreis Eisenstadt
Landkreis Gänserndorf
Landkreis Gmünd
Landkreis Hollabrunn
Landkreis Horn
Landkreis Korneuburg
Landkreis Krems
Landkreis Lilienfeld
Landkreis Melk
Landkreis Mistelbach an der Zaya
Landkreis Neubistritz
Landkreis Neunkirchen in Niederdonau
Landkreis Nikolsburg
Landkreis Oberpullendorf
Landkreis Sankt Pölten
Landkreis Scheibbs
Landkreis Tulln
Landkreis Waidhofen an der Thaya
Landkreis Wiener Neustadt
Landkreis Znaim
Landkreis Zwettl

References

External links
 Illustrated list of Gauleiter

Lower Danube
1938 establishments in Germany
1945 disestablishments in Germany
Lower Austria